This article is a list of Japanese film directors.



A
 Yutaka Abe
 Masao Adachi
 Kyōko Aizome
 Masatoshi Akihara
 Keita Amemiya
 Tetsurō Amino
 Hiroshi Ando
 Hideaki Anno
 Shinji Aoyama 
 Tarō Araki
 Genjiro Arato
 Mari Asato

D
 Masanobu Deme
 Nobuhiro Doi

F

 Kei Fujiwara 
 Kinji Fukasaku 
 Jun Fukuda 
 Yasuo Furuhata 
 Tomoyuki Furumaya

G
 Hideo Gosha 
 Heinosuke Gosho

H
 Sachi Hamano 
 Tsutomu Hanabusa
 Susumu Hani 
 Masato Harada 
 Yasuharu Hasebe 
 Kazuhiko Hasegawa 
 Ryusuke Hamaguchi 
 Ryōsuke Hashiguchi 
 Kaizo Hayashi 
 Shinji Higuchi 
 Hideyuki Hirayama 
 Ryūichi Hiroki 
 Ishirō Honda

I
 Jun Ichikawa
 Kon Ichikawa 
 Mako Idemitsu
 George Iida 
 Takahiko Iimura
 Toshiharu Ikeda
 Kazuo Ikehiro 
 Yutaka Ikejima
 Kaoru Ikeya
 Kunihiko Ikuhara
 Tadashi Imai 
 Shohei Imamura 
 Shinji Imaoka 
 Hiroshi Inagaki
 Haruo Inoue
 Umetsugu Inoue
 Isshin Inudo
 Minoru Inuzuka
 Yu Irie
 Katsuhito Ishii 
 Sōgo Ishii 
 Takashi Ishii 
 Teruo Ishii
 Yuya Ishii
 Kyōhei Ishiguro
 Noboru Ishiguro
 Hiroshi Ishikawa
 Itsumichi Isomura
 Juzo Itami 
 Mansaku Itami
 Daisuke Itō  
 Shunya Itō 
 Shunji Iwai
 Yuki Iwata
 Shigeru Izumiya
 Kazuyuki Izutsu

K
 Norimasa Kaeriyama 
 Shusuke Kaneko
 Yoshikazu Katō  
 Naomi Kawase 
 Yūzō Kawashima 
 Keisuke Kinoshita 
 Teinosuke Kinugasa 
 Ryuhei Kitamura 
 Takeshi Kitano 
 Masaki Kobayashi 
 Satoru Kobayashi  
 Takashi Koizumi 
 Satoshi Kon 
 Masaru Konuma 
 Hirokazu Koreeda 
 Seijirō Kōyama 
 Kei Kumai 
 Tatsumi Kumashiro 
 Minoru Kunizawa 
 Kazuo Kuroki 
 Akira Kurosawa 
 Kiyoshi Kurosawa

M
 Kunitoshi Manda
 Yasuzo Masumura 
 Mitsuru Meike 
 Mitsuhiro Mihara 
 Takashi Miike 
 Takahiro Miki
 Kenji Misumi 
 Kōki Mitani 
 Hayao Miyazaki 
 Kenji Mizoguchi 
 Yoshimitsu Morita 
 Katsuyuki Motohiro
 Kan Mukai 
 Ryū Murakami 
 Minoru Murata

N
 Kenji Nagasaki
 Shunichi Nagasaki 
 Masahiko Nagasawa 
 Sadao Nakajima 
 Hiroyuki Nakano 
 Hideo Nakata 
 Mikio Naruse 
 Giichi Nishihara 
 Katsumi Nishikawa 
 Miwa Nishikawa 
 Yoshitaro Nomura

O
 Mipo O
 Nobuhiko Obayashi
 Masayuki Ochiai
 Motoyoshi Oda
 Akira Ogata
 Shinsuke Ogawa
 Naoko Ogigami
 Kōhei Oguri
 Kōyū Ohara
 Kihachi Okamoto
 Eiji Okuda
 Shutaro Oku
 Kazuki Ōmori
 Tatsushi Ōmori
 Hideo Onchi
 Mamoru Oshii
 Nagisa Oshima
 Kentarō Ōtani
 Katsuhiro Otomo
 Keiichi Ozawa 
 Yasujirō Ozu

S
 Sabu   (Tanaka Hiroyuki)
 Yoichi Sai  (Choi Yang-il)
 Kōichi Saitō  
 Torajiro Saito 
 Junji Sakamoto 
 Kazuhiro Sano 
 Hirohisa Sasaki
 Hisayasu Satō
 Junya Sato 
 Shimako Satō
 Toshiki Satō 
 Yūichi Satō
 Kōji Seki 
 Kazuyoshi Sekine 
 Makoto Shinkai 
 Yasujirō Shimazu 
 Hiroshi Shimizu  
 Takashi Shimizu 
 Kaneto Shindo 
 Kōji Shiraishi
 Masahiro Shinoda 
 Tetsuo Shinohara 
 Makoto Shinozaki 
 Akihiko Shiota 
 Chūsei Sone 
 Masayuki Suo 
 Nobuhiro Suwa 
 Seijun Suzuki

T
 Yūji Tajiri 
 Gō Takamine 
 Lisa Takeba
 Tetsuji Takechi 
 Tetsuya Takehora 
 Yōjirō Takita 
 Yuki Tanada
 Eizō Tanaka 
 Noboru Tanaka 
 Tomotaka Tasaka 
 Shūji Terayama
 Hiroshi Teshigahara 
 Shirō Toyoda 
 Toshiaki Toyoda 
 Eiji Tsuburaya 
 Yutaka Tsuchiya 
 Shinya Tsukamoto

U
 Kenji Uchida
 Tomu Uchida
 Toshiya Ueno
 Kirio Urayama
 Kiyohiko Ushihara

W
 Kōji Wakamatsu 
 Mamoru Watanabe

Y
 Takeshi Yagi 
 Yamada Yoji 
 Kazuhiko Yamaguchi 
 Masashi Yamamoto 
 Satsuo Yamamoto 
 Sadao Yamanaka 
 Mitsuo Yanagimachi 
 Keisuke Yoshida 
 Kōta Yoshida
 Isao Yukisada 
 Yumi Yoshiyuki

Z
 Takahisa Zeze

External links 
 Japanese Documentary Retrospective at the Punto de Vista Documentary Film Festival of Navarra, Spain

 
Japan
Film directors